The Civil Aviation Accident and Incident Investigation Commission (CIAIAC) is the Spanish national agency responsible for air accident investigation. It is a division of the Ministry of Public Works and Transport. The CIAIAC investigates all the accidents and incidents of civil aircraft that take place in Spanish territory.

The CIAIAC also maintains detailed statistics of all the air accidents and incidents in Spain.

The headquarters of the CIAIAC are in Latina, Madrid.

See also

Aviation safety
Binter Mediterráneo Flight 8261
Britannia Airways Flight 226A
Dan-Air Flight 1008
Comisión de Investigación de Accidentes Ferroviarios
Spanair Flight 5022
Standing Commission for Maritime Accident and Incident Investigations
Tenerife airport disaster

References

External links
 CIAIAC's website
 CIAIAC's website (Archive)
 CIAIAC's website (Archive)
Statistic of air accidents in Spain 1990-2007 

Spain
Aviation organisations based in Spain
Government of Spain
Organisations based in Madrid
Civil aviation in Spain